The 1979 NCAA Division I Men's Soccer Tournament was the 21st organized men's college soccer tournament by the National Collegiate Athletic Association, to determine the top college soccer team in the United States. The SIU Edwardsville Cougars won their first national title by defeating the Clemson Tigers in the championship game, 3–2. The final match was played on December 9, 1979, in Tampa, Florida, at Tampa Stadium for the second straight year.

Tournament field

Championship Rounds

Third-Place Final

Final

See also  
 1979 NCAA Division II Soccer Championship
 1979 NCAA Division III Soccer Championship
 1979 NAIA Soccer Championship

References 

NCAA Division I Men's Soccer Tournament seasons
NCAA Division I Men's
Sports competitions in Tampa, Florida
NCAA Division I Men's Soccer Tournament
NCAA Division I Men's Soccer Tournament
Soccer in Florida